RWJ Airpark  is a public-use airport located in Beach City, Chambers County, Texas, United States, seven miles (11 km) east of the central business district of Baytown. It was privately owned by the R. W. Johnson Const. Co. Inc, but, as of 2022, its owned by IMC Service and Supply.

Facilities and aircraft

For the 12-month period ending July 12, 2004, the airport had 9,300 general aviation aircraft operations, an average of 25 per day. At that time there were 45 aircraft based at the airport: 67% single-engine, 7% multi-engine and 27% ultralight.

References

External links

Airports in Texas
Airports in Greater Houston
Buildings and structures in Chambers County, Texas
Residential airparks
Transportation in Chambers County, Texas